Collector's Item is a compilation album released by UK neo-progressive band Twelfth Night in 1991 as a CD and double album, and re-released on CD only with some different tracks in 2001.

Details
The album came about after the Geoff Mann-fronted line-up of the band reunited briefly to record a studio version of "The Collector", an epic from the early 1980s which they felt they had never managed to produce a definitive version of; at the same time, a new recording of "Love Song" was made. The band decided that the best way to bring the recordings to light was as part of a compilation of their work spanning both the Geoff Mann and Andy Sears eras, which ultimately saw the light of day in 1991. The LP release was a double album, and therefore could accommodate three extra songs.

In 2001, Cyclops Records - the band's publishers at the time, who were producing a series of reissues - rereleased the CD version of the album with some alterations. The version of "Sequences" was removed, since at the time "Live and Let Live" was readily available; in its place were three different songs.

Track listing
All songs written by Twelfth Night.

Personnel
 Rick Battersby keyboards (not on We Are Sane)
 Brian Devoil drums, percussion
 Geoff Mann vocals (not on Art And Illusion, First New Day, Take A Look, Last Song, Für Helene Part I)
 Clive Mitten keyboards (on We Are Sane), bass
 Andy Revell guitar
 Andy Sears vocals (on Art And Illusion, First New Day, Take A Look, Last Song)

Twelfth Night (band) albums
1991 compilation albums